Runcorn RLC are a rugby league club based in Runcorn, Cheshire, England. They play in the North West Men's League.

History
The first rugby league club in the town was Runcorn RFC which joined the Northern Union in 1895, just several days after it was founded. But the club folded in 1918.

Huyton RLFC moved to Runcorn FC's Canal Street in 1985 and became known as Runcorn Highfield. The club lasted in Runcorn until 1991 when it was renamed Highfield and moved to St Helens before being wound up in 1996.

The present club was founded in 2005 as Runcorn Vikings, joining the Rugby League Conference North West division. In 2006, they played in the Cheshire Division, which was effectively the old North West Division renamed to reflect where most of the teams were based.

In the 2007 season, Runcorn dropped the Vikings moniker. For 2007 there were separate North West and Cheshire Divisions, with Runcorn remaining in the Cheshire Division until 2009.

Runcorn RLC stepped up to the Rugby League Conference North West Premier in 2009. Runcorn  withdrew from the North West Premier Division in 2010.

The club joined the North West Mens League Division 4 in 2015.

English rugby league teams
Rugby league teams in Cheshire
Rugby League Conference teams
Rugby clubs established in 2005
2005 establishments in England